E 552 is a B-class European route connecting Munich in Germany to Linz in Austria. The route is approximately 243 km long.

Route and E-road junctions
  (on shared signage  then  B 12)
Neuötting
Simbach am Inn (near Austrian border)

  (on shared signage  (a Landesstraße) then  then )
Braunau am Inn (near German border)
Wels
Linz:  ,

External links 
 UN Economic Commission for Europe: Overall Map of E-road Network (2007)
 International E-road network

International E-road network
552
Roads in Austria